The following is a list of characters from the Virtua Fighter fighting game series released by Sega. Starting with Virtua Fighter, this series has spanned five games (not including updates) and has been released on arcade systems as well as home consoles.

Characters

Notes:

 Only playable with a code.
 Only in VF4 Evolution\Final Tuned.
 Only in VF5 R\Final Showdown\Ultimate Showdown.
 Unlockable.
 NPC in VF5 Ultimate Showdown

Introduced in Virtua Fighter

Akira Yuki

Pai Chan
Voiced by (English): Evelyn Huynh (VQ), Amy Tipton (anime)Voiced by (Japanese): Junko Iwao (VF2), Minami Takayama (VF3–present), Naoko Matsui (anime)

 debuted in the first Virtua Fighter. She is the daughter of Lau Chan, another character in the game. Pai Chan was born May 17, 1975 in Hong Kong. She is a martial arts action movie star in her hometown, and her fighting style is Mizongyi (pronounced "Ensei-Ken" in Japanese). It is revealed that her favourite hobby is dancing. Pai is a leading star in Hong Kong action films. Her moods change as quickly as a cat's – she can erupt in passion in one minute, and turn icy cold in the next. Pai is Lau's only daughter, who specially trained her in martial arts from a young age. In the original Virtua Fighter, however, while Lau obsessively strove on with his training, Pai's mother worked so hard to support the family that she died of overwork. Her death devastated Pai and she blamed it on Lau; she swore that one day she would beat him. Two years later, she had become successful in the movie industry. After failing to defeat her father several times, Pai eventually learns that Lau has become ill and seeks to find a successor to his school of martial arts. Pai's goal to avenge her mother shifts and she becomes determined to defeat her father in order to gain his acknowledgment as a worthy successor and his daughter.

She also appears in Project X Zone alongside Akira as a pair unit, and returned in the sequel as a solo unit, with Kage-Maru replacing her as Akira's partner. Along with Akira Yuki and Sarah Bryant, Pai Chan makes a guest appearance in Dead or Alive 5. She appears in Dengeki Bunko: Fighting Climax as Akira's assist, and was originally a non-playable final boss character in the arcade version.

Lau Chan
Voiced by (English): Charles Martinet (VQ)Voiced by (Japanese): Shigeru Chiba

 is a leading Chinese chef and is also a master of the legendary martial art Koen-Ken (Tiger Swallow Fist) A quiet man, he nevertheless has the air of resourcefulness and skill seen only in those skilled in the art of Tiger Swallow Fist. His cold appearance belies a gentle nature. He achieved one of his life's ambitions when he was awarded the Grand Prix at the world's most renowned competition for Chinese chefs. As a perfectionist by nature, he enters the World Fighting Tournament to achieve mastery in another craft—at the cost of abandoning his daughter, Pai. He is from Northern China, Shandong Province. He was the winner of the First World Tournament (Virtua Fighter). This made him happy as his martial arts school was looking for a successor and the requirement was for him to win the Tournament. After the First Tournament, he retreated to the mountains to train and develop new techniques to improve his ultimate art.

Kage-Maru
Voiced by (English): David Rosenthal (VQ), Geoff Whitesell (anime)Voiced by (Japanese): Takenobu Mitsuyoshi (games), Kiyoyuki Yanada (anime)

 fights with Hagakure-ryu Jujutsu. He was born in the village of Hagakure. "Kage-Maru" is the name given to members of the Hagakure clan who work in secret in the shadows of society. His birthright was to become the tenth-generation Kage-Maru. His father, the ninth-generation Kage-Maru, taught him the fearsome Hagakure fighting technique. One day, his mother, the eighth-generation Tsukikage, was kidnapped by J6 (judgement6). She was brainwashed and constantly having cybernetic improvements applied, she became a cyborg, immune to feeling. Several years later, the village of Hagakure was attacked by her, now known as Dural. Kage-Maru and his father were out fishing, but quickly returned when they saw the blazing village. They were too late, however, and the village was destroyed. Kage-Maru's father was killed by a bullet from the mystery group and the next morning, Kage-Maru salvaged a keepsake from his father, donned his costume, and embarked on a journey to prepare himself to take vengeance on those who spilled his father's blood. He also appears in Project X Zone 2 with Akira Yuki as a pair unit.

Kage-Maru is the most accomplished competitor in Virtua Fighter, having won both the 3rd and 4th tournaments. In 2006 Kage was featured on The Armchair Empire for Top 10: Best Ninjas at number #9. In 2010, PC World.idg included him in their list of top ten video game ninja characters at number #7, ridiculing his "Richard Garriott headband" but applauding him for "an authentic simulation of Jujutsu" and that Kage-Maru is one of the more realistic depictions of ninjas in gaming. at GameZone, he was listed as one of the best video game ninjas, who reasoned "sneaky abilities galore, and [powerful] grab maneuvers."

Sarah Bryant

Jacky Bryant
Voiced by (English): Eric Kelso (VF4–present)Voiced by (Japanese): Yasunori Matsumoto (anime), Kunihiro Kawamoto (CR Virtua Fighter)

 is a race car driver that debuted in the original Virtua Fighter. He fights using Bruce Lee's incredibly versatile Jeet Kune Do style, allowing him a few of Bruce Lee's actual techniques that he chose to perfect during his lifetime. The most important aspect of Jacky's game are his combos, which can be utilized to repeatedly strike and inflict massive damage. He also seems to have a brash and confident attitude. The eldest son of the Bryant family, Jacky is Sarah's older brother. He maintains his cool in every situation. Those on the Indy racing circuit call him the Blue Flash. Jacky was seriously injured in an accident in the 1990 Indianapolis 500, and spent two years in a grueling rehabilitation program. Just when his injury had healed, he discovered the existence of the mystery group behind the accident. At the same time, his younger sister Sarah disappeared. Jacky's battle began as he pursued the trail of the group who held the key to these mysteries.

Jacky is a playable racer (with Akira as his partner on the console versions) in Sonic & Sega All-Stars Racing. He appears in Dead or Alive 5 Ultimate, making him the fourth addition to the game from the Virtua Fighter series alongside Akira Yuki, Sarah Bryant, and Pai Chan. A Mii Fighter costume based on Jacky's Virtua Fighter 5 appearance appears in Super Smash Bros. for Nintendo 3DS and Wii U and Super Smash Bros. Ultimate  as downloadable content alongside an Akira Mii Fighter costume.

Wolf Hawkfield
Voiced by (English): Dennis Gunn (VF4–present)Voiced by (Japanese): Unshō Ishizuka (anime), Keikou Sakai (CR Vitura Fighter)

 is a professional wrestler from Canada that debuted in the original Virtua Fighter. He lived as a First Nations woodsman and hunter in the Canadian wilderness until he was discovered on a scouting trip by a professional wrestling promoter.

A quiet man who loves nature, he has his gentle side. He is filled with fighting spirit, however, and once provoked he is not satisfied until he finishes the job at hand. Being the strongest, he was an instant star in the pro wrestling area, and successfully defended his title several times. Dissatisfied with the level of competition, however, he turned in his belt and retired from the ring. Hearing of the World tournament, he entered to seek worthy opponents. After the end of the second tournament, Wolf had a recurring nightmare about the world being in danger. This dream was the sole reason for him joining the third tournament (Virtua Fighter 3). However, since he was defeated in the third tournament, he decided to ignore the dream and went back home. Back there, Wolf entered in countless underground tournaments and dominated. However, the same dream still haunts him.

Wolf appeared in All Japan Pro Wrestling Featuring Virtua (arcade and Sega Saturn 1997) and All Japan Pro Wrestling 2 Giant Gram (arcade and Sega Dreamcast 1999). Professional wrestler Jim Steele wrestled as "Wolf Hawkfield" in All Japan Pro Wrestling from 1997 to 2000.

IGN listed Wolf as the 4th best fake wrestler in video games, while GamesRadar ranked him as the 2nd best video game wrestler, stating "Beyond his skills and masterfully tailored ring attire, Wolf is one of gaming's most important wrestlers because of his comical self seriousness."

Jeffry McWild
Voiced by (English): Ryan Drees (VF4–present)Voiced by (Japanese): Ryuzaburo Otomo (anime), Keikou Sakai (CR Virtua Fighter)

 is an Australian Aboriginal fisherman and Pankration practitioner that debuted in the original Virtua Fighter. The most skillful fisherman of his village, he has an engaging personality. He was bested by only one opponent - the giant, eight-meter long, man-eating "Satan Shark". They fought several battles, and finally met in their ultimate match. Jeffry was routed and his boat wrecked, but he somehow managed to recover as he hovered on the verge of death. He entered the World Fighting Tournament with a vow to build a new boat and do battle with the "Satan Shark" again. After the third world tournament, Jeffry finally has some cash to build his boat.

However, with the boat completed, Jeffry finds out that the "Satan Shark" has mysteriously disappeared. Unable to find the "Satan Shark", Jeffry starts asking the other fishermen the whereabouts of the "Satan Shark". He was then told the location of where the "Satan Shark" was seen last. However, even though he now had the location of the "Satan Shark"'s new hunting ground, he was still unable to find the "Satan Shark". When he hears of the fourth world tournament, he decides to join in hope of winning the cash just so he can afford a sonar device to hunt for the "Satan Shark".

Dural
 is a Gynoid-like creature that debuted in the original Virtua Fighter as the game's boss character. She fights with a mix of all the other characters' styles. Dural was previously a human woman. According to canon, the first model was Kage-Maru's kidnapped mother. When the mysterious corporation J6 (Judgement 6) noticed her exemplary fighting ability and resilient body, they captured her and used her as their prototype for their terrifying Dural project. Arming her body with various cybernetic enhancements and brainwashing, she became a cyborg, immune to feeling.

Dural is a secret character in the series. Her name is a direct reference to the joypad manipulation needed to enable her as a playable character (Down, Up, Right, then A button plus Left together; D, U, R, A+L). Dural also appears as a rival unit in Project X Zone and Project X Zone 2.

Syfy listed her as one of the most "disturbing" video game characters, where they stated "Dural is a cyborg and she can copy the moves of other characters. So when you fight her, you're not just getting your ass kicked. Your getting your ass kicked by techniques that YOU thought you had mastery over."

Introduced in Virtua Fighter 2

Lion Rafale
Voiced by (English): Jeff Manning (VF4–present)Voiced by (Japanese): Tetsuya Iwanaga (anime), Tetsuya Kakihara (CR Virtua Fighter)

 is a high school student from France that debuted in Virtua Fighter 2. He fights to gain independence from his father, and uses the style of Praying Mantis Kung Fu. He is born into the Rafale family, one of the wealthiest families in France. They are involved in the aircraft industry (see Dassault Rafale). But this business is just a front for their involvement in illegal arms contracts with terrorists. Lion has been practicing Praying Mantis Kung Fu under an instructor as part of management education since he was five. He resents his father's control over his life and during one of their arguments, his father proposed that Lion must win the World Fighting Tournament as a prerequisite to become free from him.

Shun Di
Voiced by (English): Charles Martinet (VQ)Voiced by (Japanese): Hitoshi Takagi (VF2–VF3), Mahito Tsujimura (VF4–VF5), Koichi Kitamura (anime)

Shun Di (Chinese: 舜帝 Pinyin: Shùn Dì, Japanese: シュン・ディ Shun Di) is an herbal doctor from China that debuted in Virtua Fighter 2. He uses Drunken boxing. Shun is from Northern China and is considered as a sage by many. He teaches in his small training hall and had many students in the past but most have left him by now. This is due to his keen interest in taking students able to take hardship as part of the training. While drinking with his friends, Shun hears them boasting about the success of one of their student fighters in recent tournament competitions. He suddenly exclaims, "I also want to participate in the World Fighting Tournament". Shun's friends pleaded with him not to, but once Shun had mentioned his intent to fight, he was adamant and eventually joined the tournament.

Introduced in Virtua Fighter 3

Aoi Umenokoji
Voiced by (English): Debbie Rogers (VQ)Voiced by (Japanese): Nina Kumagaya

 is a student from Japan who debuted in Virtua Fighter 3. She fights with Aiki Ju-Jutsu. She joined the tournament to test herself, like her childhood friend Akira Yuki. She enjoys Japanese paper fan dancing (as shown in a character/graphics promo video for Virtua Fighter 3) and her hobby is ikebana. She is the eldest child of a dojo owner in Kyoto. Her father and Akira Yuki's father are old friends. As children, she and Akira would spar against each other. After seeing him compete in the tournament, she resolves to enter it herself and prove her fighting ability. Two games later, she gets a rival in Italian kickboxer Brad Burns.

Aoi was first seen by the public as part of a teaser campaign for Virtua Fighter 3. The back of the Virtua Fighter 1996 calendar showed an assemblage of images from the Virtua Fighter 2 CG Portrait Series; mixed in with these was a CG image of Aoi's left eye. The character was fully unveiled at the Japanese AOU show on February 21, 1996, in the form of a demo video of her performing a traditional dance with a paper fan.

In the Sega Saturn game Fighters Megamix, which was released before Aoi had appeared in any home console games, the secret character Janet Marshall uses a slightly modified variation of Aoi's move set from Virtua Fighter 3.

Taka-Arashi
Voiced by: Kiyoyuki Yanada

 is a sumo wrestler from Japan. His first appearance was in Virtua Fighter 3, and his fighting technique is sumo. He wears a kesho mawashi as a sign that he is a high-ranked sumo wrestler. Yu Suzuki expressed doubt that AM2 would be able to include Taka-Arashi in Virtua Fighter 3 because his mass created difficulties with his jumping moves, and he was not shown to the public until the Tokyo Toy Show in June 1996. Taka-Arashi's mass continued to present challenges, and he did not appear in subsequent installments of the Virtua Fighter series because his large size was deemed too difficult to simulate at the time. He bears the distinction of being the only character in the series ever to be retired, at least for a few games. In the Sumo world, Taka-Arashi is famous for his unusually brutal version of the fighting style. One day, while entertaining at an American bar, Taka-Arashi agreed to settle an argument in an underground fist fight. Taka-Arashi fiercely bested his opponent, a man famous in the world of underground fighting. Upon his return to Japan, Taka-Arashi informed his boss of his decision to leave Sumo wrestling. On that same day, Taka-Arashi received an invitation to the 3rd World Fighting Tournament, and, with blood still boiling with the thrill of battle, decided to enter.

Taka-Arashi was added to the roster of Virtua Fighter 5 R, having had return to a Sumo world as a now seasoned fighter and eventually being invited back to the world tournament for its 5th course. This is his first appearance since Virtua Fighter 3. His stage is a larger-than-regulation dohyo, with a large audience.

Introduced in Virtua Fighter 4 and Virtua Fighter 4: Evolution

Brad Burns
Voiced by (English): Dominic Allen (VF5)Voiced by (Japanese): Nobuaki Kanemitsu (CR Virtua Fighter)
 is a Muay Thai fighter from Italy who debuted in Virtua Fighter 4 Evolution. Brad wants nothing more than the thrill of a heated fight and the company of beautiful women. In the kickboxing world, a new style is being created. A newcomer, Brad Burns, suddenly appeared and won many successive victories. Because of his good looks, he has many female fans. What's more, he likes to go out with such girls at night after his battles and present a charming personality.

In the ring, his manner is the opposite of his social self, and he overwhelms opponents with sharp attacks, such attacks include extremely powerful kicks, elbows, knees and punches, mainly Muay Thai techniques. Quickly, he was rising to the champion's seat. After becoming the undefeated champion, there was nobody in his region left to do battle with, so he began to look for his next stage. About that time, a woman told him about the World Fighting Tournament. It is a different kind of martial-arts fighting, and he wanted the thrill of an especially heated fight. Thus, he determined he would participate in the tournament. He gains a female rival in Aoi Umenokoji.

Goh Hinogami
Voiced by: Toshihiko Seki
 is an enigmatic assassin for J6 who fights with Judo and debuted in Virtua Fighter 4 Evolution. He has orders to send the tournament participants into a dark oblivion.
His personality is sadistic and brutal, due to the death of his father at the hands of a jealous associate, coupled with his violent upbringing in a J6 training facility. He often taunts his fallen opponents, occasionally kicking them or stomping down on them after they have been defeated. He absolutely hates to lose, and takes any sort of defeat very personally. He was introduced as a rival to Akira Yuki.

Lei-Fei
Voiced by (English): Jeff Kramer (VQ)Voiced by (Japanese): Takahiro Sakurai

Lei-Fei (Chinese: 雷飛 Pinyin: Léi Fēi, Japanese: レイ・フェイ Rei Fei) is a monk from China who debuted in Virtua Fighter 4. He entered the tournament to kill Lau Chan on orders; however, he also has a secret agenda. He fights with Shaolin-Ken. During the ancient days in China, one emperor declared that all powerful martial art techniques shall be banned. This decree was done with the intention of ensuring that no one shall possess a more powerful technique than the emperor himself. The emperor also saw to the deaths of anyone who was capable of powerful techniques. He created a clan whose sole duty is to capture and kill anyone with such powerful capabilities. The Tiger Swallow Fist was one such skill that was banned by the emperor during that age.

While no emperor exists in modern China, the clan that was created still exists. When informed of the Tiger Swallow Fist's appearance in the world tournament, they decided to send Lei to stop Lau from using the Tiger Swallow Fist. Lei accepted this mission as he saw it as a chance to test his skills against the mighty Tiger Swallow Fist. However, Lei intends to kill Lau after he has learned Tiger Swallow Fist from Lau.

Vanessa Lewis
Voiced by (English): Donna Burke (VF4–VQ), Bianca Allen (VF5)Voiced by (Japanese): Ayumi Tsunematsu (CR Virtua Fighter)

 is a security guard of unknown origin who debuted in Virtua Fighter 4. She entered the tournament as Sarah's bodyguard after hearing of J6's plans to re-capture her. She fights with Vale Tudo. When she was still a child, Vanessa's parents were killed. She was taken by J6 shortly afterwards, and trained to be an instrument of combat. A man named Lewis, a member of the special forces, infiltrated J6 and rescued Vanessa. Vanessa grew close to him. However, their time together was brief, as a member of J6's special forces murdered Lewis. Years later, she has joined an organization to protect important individuals. One day, she hears of J6's intention to capture Sarah in the 4th tournament. Vanessa decides to join the 4th tournament not only as Sarah's bodyguard, but to find Lewis's murderer as well.

Introduced in Virtua Fighter 5 and Virtua Fighter 5: R

Eileen
Voiced by: Anri Shiono

 is a girl who fights with Monkey Kung Fu (Xing Yi Quan). She debuted in Virtua Fighter 5 and is the youngest character in the series (the characters' ages were never explained after VF2, so Eileen's current age number is indeterminate). After losing both of her parents at a young age, Eileen was raised by her grandfather—a "Kou-Ken" martial arts master from China. In addition to her grandfather's training, she perfected her skills with a Beijing opera troupe. One day, she happened to see a martial arts demonstration by Pai Chan and was amazed and captivated by the beauty and strength of her movements. Since that time, Eileen thinks of little else besides finding a way to approach Pai. To this end, she enters the Fifth World Fighting Tournament to find Pai.

The kanji that appears on the shirt-tail of Eileen's main outfit is the Chinese character for "love" which is pronounced "Ai" (あい or 愛）) encircled in a ring.

El Blaze
Voiced by (English): Walter Roberts (VF5)Voiced by (Japanese): Hiroo Sasaki (CR Virtua Fighter)

 is a wrestler from Mexico who fights with Lucha Libre. His debut was in Virtua Fighter 5. With his lightning fast Lucha Libre fighting style, his reputation spread - finally reaching the J6 tournament judges. They were impressed with the way he defeated wave after wave of opponents in the light-heavyweight division. As he watched Wolf dominate the heavyweight division, he burned with envy and jealousy. He knew the only way to combat these feelings was to prove that he was truly the best fighter in the world and he quickly signed up for the Fifth World Fighting Tournament.

Jean Kujo
Voiced by: Wataru Hatano

 is a French full-contact (Kyokushin) karate fighter and a brainwashed assassin for J6 who debuted in Virtua Fighter 5 R. Following Goh Hinogami's defeat at the hands of Jacky Bryant in the Fourth World Fighting Tournament, he now gets his chance to prove his worth. He soon decides to target Lion Rafale specifically, unaware that they used to be childhood friends.

Other characters

Siba
 (also known as ) is a prototype character from the earlier builds of the original Virtua Fighter who was removed prior to the game's release, and was replaced by eventual series mascot Akira Yuki. A portrait of his appeared alongside portraits of the remaining original Virtua Fighter cast on the arcade game's cabinets, though his name was mislabeled as "Akira".
He is a Middle-Eastern fighter wearing a white and purple keffiyeh, a white shirt, a purple sash; green Arabian-style pants; and red sandals. According to early beta screenshots and magazines, he was originally called "Siba", but had his name changed to "Majid Abdul" sometime during development before being scrapped altogether.

Siba is accessible through the Multiple Arcade Machine Emulator version of Virtua Fighter only via manually inserted cheat codes as a result of several data miners' discovery of unused character files hidden in the game's code. According to his profile in the character selection screen, he is a bouncer hailing from Saudi Arabia. Additionally, his name is misspelt as "Majido Ab Dul".

Despite never officially appearing as a playable character in the Virtua Fighter series, Siba would become playable in Fighters Megamix as a secret character who is unlocked after completing the "Bosses" course.

Jeff
 is another unused characters from the original Virtua Fighter. Like Siba, his data remains in the arcade version, and he is also accessible through cheat codes.

Jeff is a military character who wears camo gear, a hat, and shades, of which the latter two can be knocked off in a fight. While playable, his moveset is unfinished, as he uses a handful of Jacky's techniques and lacks throws.

His full name, Jeffery Buckman, is a likely tribute to actual VF1 design staff member Jeffrey Buchanan. The name Jeffery (minus an e) would eventually be shifted to Jeffry McWild.

Judgement Six
, J6 for short, are the organization behind the series' tournaments that plots world domination.  The organization is named for the six executives who run the organization, each named for a card in the Major Arcana.
 Judgement, who leads and commands the organization, and is the main antagonist of the series.
 The Devil, who develops conventional weapons, and is responsible for creating Dural.
 Wheel of Fortune, who handles global political affairs.
 The Moon, who funds military strife and terrorist activity.
 The Tower, who monitors the organization to its extremities.
 Death, who develops nuclear, chemical, and biological weapons.

References

 
Lists of Sega characters
Lists of video game characters